Thoudam Joychandra Singh (born 2 January 1984 in Manipur) is an Indian professional footballer who plays as a midfielder for Rangdajied United F.C. in the I-League.

References

External links 
 Goal Profile

1984 births
Living people
Indian footballers
Sporting Clube de Goa players
United SC players
Rangdajied United F.C. players
Association football midfielders
Footballers from Manipur
I-League players
People from Bishnupur district